The canton of Le Libournais-Fronsadais is an administrative division of the Gironde department, southwestern France. It was created at the French canton reorganisation which came into effect in March 2015. Its seat is in Libourne.

It consists of the following communes:
 
Arveyres
Asques
Les Billaux
Cadarsac
Cadillac-en-Fronsadais
Fronsac
Galgon
Izon
Lalande-de-Pomerol
La Lande-de-Fronsac
Libourne
Lugon-et-l'Île-du-Carnay
Mouillac
Pomerol
La Rivière
Saillans
Saint-Aignan
Saint-Germain-de-la-Rivière
Saint-Michel-de-Fronsac
Saint-Romain-la-Virvée
Tarnès
Vayres
Vérac
Villegouge

References

Cantons of Gironde